Scopula limosata is a moth of the family Geometridae. It was described by David Stephen Fletcher in 1963. It is found in the Democratic Republic of the Congo and Uganda.

References

Moths described in 1963
limosata
Moths of Africa